Leptospermum whitei is a species of shrub that is endemic to eastern Australia. It has fibrous, flaky bark, elliptical leaves, white flowers arranged in small groups on the ends of short side branches, and fruit that falls from the plant when mature.

Description

Taxonomy and naming
This tea-tree was formally described in 1920 by Cyril Tenison White and William D. Francis who gave it the name Agonis elliptica and published the description in the Botany Bulletin of the Department of Agriculture, Queensland from specimens collected by Francis near Beerwah. In 1932, Edwin Cheel transferred the species to the genus ''Leptospermum, but since there was already a species L. ellipticum (now known as Pericalymma ellipticum), Cheel changed the name to L. whitei, honouring C.T.White.

Distribution and habitat
Leptospermum whitei grows in swampy, coastal heath between Wide Bay in Queensland and Coffs Harbour in New South Wales.

References

whitei
Myrtales of Australia
Flora of New South Wales
Flora of Queensland
Plants described in 1920
Taxa named by Cyril Tenison White